The mayor of San Jose del Monte is the head of the local government of the city who elected to three year terms. The Mayor is also the executive head and leads the city's departments in executing the city ordinances and improving public services. The city mayor is restricted to three consecutive terms, totaling nine years, although a mayor can be elected again after an interruption of one term.

The current mayor is Arthur Robes since June 30, 2016.

List of mayors of San Jose del Monte

See also
San Jose del Monte
San Jose del Monte's at-large congressional district
Angelito M. Sarmiento
Eduardo V. Roquero M.D.

Notes

References

Politics of San Jose del Monte
San Jose del Monte